Gonatus antarcticus is a squid in the family Gonatidae. The species is known with certainty only from southern Atlantic waters but it may have a circum-Antarctic distribution.

Distribution
G. antarcticus occurs in waters of the Southern Ocean. Its range may be circumpolar with an Antarctic and Sub-Antarctic distribution.

Ecology
This squid is eaten by several predators in the Southern Ocean, like Albatrosses, Sperm whales, Seals and Penguins.

Based on stable isotopes analysis, this squid may be a top predator on its natural habitat.

References

External links

Squid
Molluscs described in 1898